IRM may refer to:
 IERS Reference Meridian
 Illinois Railway Museum
 Illinois Reserve Militia, state defense force active during World War II
 Bureau of Information Resource Management, responsible for information technology of the U.S. Department of State
 Information Rights Management
 L'Institut Royal Météorologique de Belgique
 Interference reflection microscopy, a microscopy method used to image adherent cells
 Internal Revenue Manual, an official compendium of internal guidelines for personnel of the United States Internal Revenue Service
 International Review of Mission, a quarterly academic journal
 International Roaming MIN assigned by IFAST
 IRM (album), by Charlotte Gainsbourg
 Iron Mountain Incorporated, a data storage company based in Boston, Massachusetts
 ICAO designator for Mahan Air, an Iranian airline
 Islamic Republic of Mauritania

See also
 1RM